London Bridge is a bridge in Lake Havasu City, Arizona. When it was built in the 1830s, it spanned the River Thames in London, England. In 1968, the bridge was purchased from the City of London by Robert P. McCulloch.  McCulloch had exterior granite blocks from the original bridge cut and transported to the United States for use in the construction of a new bridge in Lake Havasu City, a planned community he established in 1964 on the shore of Lake Havasu. The Arizona bridge is a reinforced concrete structure clad in the original masonry of the 1830s bridge.  The bridge was completed in 1971 (along with the Bridgewater Channel Canal, separating the peninsula from the mainland), and links mainland Lake Havasu City with Pittsburgh Point.  The "rededication" of the London Bridge took place on October 10, 1971.

History

The 1831 London Bridge was the last project of engineer John Rennie and completed by his son, John Rennie. By 1962, it was not sturdy enough to carry the increased load of traffic; the bridge was sold by the City of London in April 1968 to make way for its replacement.

The purchaser, Robert P. McCulloch, was an entrepreneur and real estate developer who founded Lake Havasu City. He installed the bridge to attract tourists and retirement home buyers to his properties there.

Purchase and transfer to Arizona
The community first started as an Army Air Corps rest camp, called "Site Six" during World War II on the shores of Lake Havasu. In 1958 McCulloch purchased  of property on the east side of the lake along Pittsburgh Point, the peninsula, intending to develop the land. But the real estate agents could not bring in prospective buyers, because the land was far from centers of population and had a very hot, arid climate. McCulloch's real estate agent, Robert Plumer, learned that London Bridge was for sale and convinced McCulloch to buy it and bring it to the area to attract potential land buyers. The initial response from McCulloch was, "That's the craziest idea I have ever heard," but after consideration, he decided to go ahead and purchased it for £1.02 million ($2.46 million at that time).

There is a popular rumor that the bridge was bought in the mistaken belief that it was London's more recognizable Tower Bridge, but the allegation was vehemently denied by both McCulloch and Ivan Luckin, who arranged the bridge's sale.

The bridge's facing stones were removed, with each numbered and its position catalogued. After the bridge was dismantled, the stones were transported to a quarry in Merrivale, Devon, where  were sliced off many of the original stones.

Plumer arranged with a cargo shipping company that was going to sail a newly built ship, without any cargo, from the U.K. to the U.S. Plumer negotiated to pay for all the voyage's operating costs, in return for carrying the bridge stones as cargo to the U.S., which was far less than the going rate shipping costs.

The new ship transported the bridge in pieces through the Panama Canal and unloaded it at the Port of Long Beach, California. From there, the bridge was transported overland to Lake Havasu City, where re-assembly began in 1968.

Reconstruction in Lake Havasu

On September 23, 1968, the bridge's foundation stone was re-laid at the reconstruction site in Arizona, by Sir Gilbert Inglefield, Lord Mayor of London.
A new concrete interior structure was clad in the original stonework. The reconstruction took slightly over three years and was completed in late 1971 by Sundt Construction.

The bridge was not rebuilt over a river, but was put up on land between the main part of the city and Pittsburgh Point, which at that time was a peninsula jutting into Lake Havasu. Once completed, a construction company dredged the Bridgewater Channel Canal under the bridge, across the neck of the Pittsburgh Point peninsula. The canal separating it from the city made Pittsburgh Point an island. As a result, the bridge now traverses a navigable shortcut between the Thompson Bay in Lake Havasu, south of Pittsburgh Point, and the northern part of Lake Havasu.

Use as a tourist attraction
After the bridge was reconstructed, prospective buyers of land were attracted to visit the bridge and take a tour of properties for sale. Land sales improved, and McCulloch recouped all his expenses on the purchase and shipping of the bridge. Since he had obtained the land at no cost, the sale of the properties paid for the bridge and more. Recent years have seen much development in the area of the bridge to increase tourist interest.

The original "English Village" was an open-air mall with a hedge maze and historical museum built in faux-English style. It deteriorated over time and sections of the mall were leveled. The Lake Havasu City Convention & Visitors Bureau has undertaken a revitalization of the English Village, with conversion of the mall to condos proposed in 2011 by Virtual Realty Enterprises, its current owner.

In popular culture
 The 1983 American psychological thriller Olivia used the relocation of the bridge as a central plot device.
 The 1985 made-for-TV movie Bridge Across Time, a supernatural crime drama, used the relocation of the bridge as a plot device. In the film, the spirit of Jack the Ripper was somehow transported to 1980s Arizona along with a stone from London Bridge, resulting in a murder spree.
 The 1987 made-for-TV movie The Return of Sherlock Holmes has Holmes believing he has stumbled from the Arizona desert into a heavenly facsimile of London.
 London Bridge is featured in the 1987 film Million Dollar Mystery.
 The paranormal television series Ghost Adventures covered the story of the London Bridge, in the episode "London Bridge".
In the 1993 film Falling Down, Detective Prendergast plans to move to Lake Havasu with his wife. He sings the London Bridge tune to calm her down.
In the song "London Homesick Blues" by Gary P. Nunn a reference is made with the line "Even London Bridge has fallen down and moved to Arizona". This song was the theme song for Austin City Limits television show from 1977 to 2004.

Image gallery

See also
List of bridges documented by the Historic American Engineering Record in Arizona

References

External links

 
 
 
 Lake Havasu City Convention & Visitors Bureau about London Bridge
 RoadTrip America about London Bridge
 
 Andrew, E. (2018). How London Bridge ended up in Arizona.  Retrieved October 10, 2019.

Road bridges in Arizona
Bridges completed in 1831
Bridges completed in 1971
Landmarks in Arizona
Lower Colorado River Valley
Former buildings and structures in the City of London
Rebuilt buildings and structures in the United States
Relocated buildings and structures in Arizona
Transportation in Mohave County, Arizona
1968 establishments in Arizona
Tourist attractions in Mohave County, Arizona
Buildings and structures in Mohave County, Arizona
Lake Havasu City, Arizona
Historic American Engineering Record in Arizona
Arch bridges in the United States
Concrete bridges in the United States